Bert Bernard Snyder (December 16, 1886 - February 22, 1955) served in the California State Assembly for the 7th, 43rd, and 42nd district from 1923 to 1933. He served in the California State Senate for the 23rd district from 1933 to 1937. During World War I he also served in the United States Army.

References

United States Army personnel of World War I
Republican Party members of the California State Assembly
Republican Party California state senators
1886 births
1955 deaths
20th-century American politicians